Czechoslovakia competed at the 1952 Winter Olympics in Oslo, Norway.

Cross-country skiing

Men

Men's 4 × 10 km relay

Ice hockey

The tournament was run in a round-robin format with nine teams participating.

Czechoslovakia 8-2 Poland
Norway 0-6 Czechoslovakia
Czechoslovakia 6-1 Germany FR
Canada 4-1 Czechoslovakia
Czechoslovakia 11-2 Finland
Czechoslovakia 8-3 Switzerland
USA 6-3 Czechoslovakia
Czechoslovakia 4-0 Sweden
Sweden 5-3 Czechoslovakia 1

1 Sweden and Czechoslovakia were tied with identical record and goal differentials, so a tie breaker game was played.

Contestants'''
Slavomír Bartoň
Miloslav Blažek
Václav Bubník
Vlastimil Bubník
Miloslav Charouzd
Bronislav Danda
Karel Gut
Vlastimil Hajšman
Jan Lidral
Miroslav Nový
Miloslav Ošmera
Zdeněk Pýcha
Miroslav Rejman
Jan Richter
Oldřich Sedlák
Jiří Sekyra
Jozef Záhorský

Nordic combined 

Events:
 18 km cross-country skiing
 normal hill ski jumping

The cross-country skiing part of this event was combined with the main medal event, meaning that athletes competing here were skiing for two disciplines at the same time. Details can be found above in this article, in the cross-country skiing section.

The ski jumping (normal hill) event was held separate from the main medal event of ski jumping, results can be found in the table below (athletes were allowed to perform three jumps, the best two jumps were counted and are shown here).

References

 Olympic Winter Games 1952, full results by sports-reference.com

Nations at the 1952 Winter Olympics
1952
Olympics